is a Japanese former basketball player.

References

1971 births
Living people
Japanese men's basketball players
Panasonic Trians players
Place of birth missing (living people)
Universiade medalists in basketball
Universiade silver medalists for Japan
Medalists at the 1995 Summer Universiade